Tetragonoderus insularius is a species of beetle in the family Carabidae. It was described by Andrewes in 1931.

References

insularius
Beetles described in 1931